Eratosthenes was a Greek scholar of the third century BC.

It may also refer to:
Eratosthenes (crater), a lunar impact crater named after him
Eratosthenes (statesman), an ancient Athenian statesman of the fifth century BC
Eratosthenes Seamount
Eratosthenes of Croton, winner of the Stadion race at the 51st Olympiad in 576 BC